José Adrián Bonilla Bonilla (born April 28, 1978, in Paraíso, Costa Rica) is a Costa Rican former professional road bicycle racer. He competed at the 2000 Summer Olympics and the 2004 Summer Olympics. He debuted professionally in 2004 with the team Comunidad Valenciana.

In 2006, during the Operación Puerto doping case, he was identified as the client of a doping traffic network led by Eufemiano Fuentes, under the code name Bonilla Alfredo. Bonilla was not sanctioned by the Spanish government since doping was not a crime at the time. He did not receive any other sanction either since the judge assigned to the case refused to share the case's evidence with the World Anti-Doping Agency or the Union Cycliste Internationale. Spanish court 31 later cleared him and all the other members of Comunidad Valenciana of any involvement in the case. On a document dated 28 July 2006 the court's secretary made clear none of the team members were found guilty of doping.

Major results

1999
1st Stage 11 Vuelta Ciclista a Costa Rica
2001
1st  Time Trial Championships
2002
1st Stage 10 Vuelta Ciclista a Costa Rica
1st Overall Vuelta de Higuito
1st Overall Vuelta a Chiriquí
2003
1st Overall Vuelta Ciclista a Costa Rica
1st Stage 8
1st Overall Vuelta a Zamora
1st Stage 2
1st Overall Vuelta a Galicia
1st Stage 1 Vuelta a Chiriquí
2004
1st Stage 1 GP Estremadura
1st  Time Trial Championships
2008
1st Stages 10 & 12 Vuelta Ciclista a Costa Rica
1st Copa Nacional Protecto
1st Overall Clásica Poás
1st Overall Vuelta a Chiriquí
1st Stages 6, 8 & 9
1st Stage 3 Vuelta a San Carlos
2009
1st Stages 6 & 11 Vuelta Ciclista a Costa Rica
1st  Time Trial Championships
1st Stage 4 Vuelta a San Carlos
1st Prologue Vuelta a Chiriquí
2010
1st  Time Trial Championships
1st Desafio Powerade
1st Central American Games, Time Trial
2011
1st Overall Vuelta Ciclista a Costa Rica
1st Stages 7 & 10
1st  Time Trial Championships
1st Stages 5 & 7 Vuelta de Higuito
2013
9th Overall Vuelta Ciclista a Costa Rica

References

1978 births
Living people
People from Cartago Province
Costa Rican male cyclists
Pan American Games competitors for Costa Rica
Olympic cyclists of Costa Rica
Cyclists at the 2000 Summer Olympics
Cyclists at the 2004 Summer Olympics